Dictation: A Quartet (2008) is the seventh collection of stories by American Author Cynthia Ozick.

Stories 

Dictation

Actors

At Fumicaro

What Happened to the Baby

Synopsis 

Dictation

Approximately 15,000 Words. This story is about the secretaries of Henry James and Joseph Conrad. The two women have a brief lesbian affair and hatch a scheme to switch a paragraph from each of their bosses' new works.

Actors

Approximately 8,000 words, originally published in The New Yorker, and later in Cynthia Ozick Collected Stories. This story is about a post-middle-aged Jewish actor with an Irish-sounding stage name who has just landed the role of King Lear in an off-Broadway play written by the daughter of a famous Yiddish actor.

At Fumicaro

Approximately 11,000 words, originally published in The New Yorker and later in Cynthia Ozick Collected Stories. This story is about an American from New York who goes to Fumicaro, Italy for a conference on Catholicism. He meets a young, Italian chambermaid who is pregnant out of wedlock and decides to marry her and take her back home to America. The story takes place in the 1930s after Benito Mussolini has taken over. The characters in the story portray an eerie ambivalence to the idea of fascism. 

What Happened to the Baby

Approximately 10,000 words, published in The Atlantic and Cynthia Ozick Collected Stories. This story is about an elderly man who is in the middle of a life long ambition to create a new universal language called “GNU”, and his niece Vivian who has been charged by her mother to take care of him after his wife divorced him.

Short story collections by Cynthia Ozick
2008 short story collections
Houghton Mifflin books
Cultural depictions of Henry James
Joseph Conrad